Morten Kolseth (born 4 May 1979) is a retired Norwegian football defender.

He started his career in Vadmyra IL. He was in the squad of SK Brann in 2000, and played two Norwegian Premier League games that season. In the 2001 season he was sent on loan to Løv-Ham, and he later joined that club permanently. He also played for Åsane. Ahead of the 2005 season he joined Askøy FK. He left Askøy ahead of the 2007 season.

References

Norwegian footballers
SK Brann players
Åsane Fotball players
Løv-Ham Fotball players
Footballers from Bergen
1979 births
Living people

Association football defenders